The table below lists the reasons delivered from the bench by the Supreme Court of Canada during 2000. The table illustrates what reasons were filed by each justice in each case, and which justices joined each reason. This list, however, does not include decisions on motions.

Of the 65 judgments released in 2000, 9 were oral, and 42 were unanimous, and there were 4 motions.

Reasons

Justices of the Supreme Court

Table key

External links 
 2000 decisions: CanLII LexUM

Reasons Of The Supreme Court Of Canada, 2000
2000